Ginsenoside Rb1 (or Ginsenoside Rb1 or GRb1 or GRb1) is a chemical compound belonging to the ginsenoside family.

Like other ginsenosides, it is found in the plant genus Panax (ginseng), and has a variety of potential health effects including anticarcinogenic, immunomodulatory, anti‐inflammatory, antiallergic, antiatherosclerotic, antihypertensive, and antidiabetic effects as well as antistress activity and effects on the central nervous system.

Pharmacological effects 
A 1998 study by Seoul National University reported that GRb1 and GRg3 (ginsenosides Rb1 and Rg3) significantly attenuated glutamate-induced neurotoxicity by inhibiting the overproduction of nitric oxide synthase among some other findings regarding their neuroprotective properties.

In 2002, the Laboratory for Cancer Research in Rutgers University showed that GRb1 and GRg1 have neuroprotective effect for spinal cord neurons, while ginsenoside Re did not exhibit any activity. GRb1 and GRg1 are proposed to represent potentially effective therapeutic agents for spinal cord injuries.

The protection that GRg1 (ginsenoside Rg1) and GRb1 offer against Alzheimer’s disease symptoms in mice was first published by researchers in 2015. The GRg1 affected three metabolic pathways: the metabolism of lecithin, amino acids and sphingolipids, while GRb1 treatment affected lecithin and amino acid metabolism.

It was reported in 2017 that GRb1 improved cardiac function and remodelling in heart failure in mice. The treatment of H-ginsenoside Rb1 potentially attenuated cardiac hypertrophy and myocardial fibrosis.

Proposed biosynthesis 

The biosynthesis of GRb1 in Panax ginseng starts from farnesyl diphosphate (FPP), which is converted to squalene with squalene synthase (SQS), then to 2,3-oxidosqualene with squalene epoxidase (SE).

The 2,3-oxidasqualene is then converted to dammarenediol-II by cyclization, with dammarenediol-II synthase (DS) as the catalyst. The dammarenediol-II is converted to protopanaxadiol and then to ginsenoside Rd.

Finally, GRb1 is synthesized from ginsenoside Rd, catalysed by UDPG:ginsenoside Rd glucosyltransferase (UGRdGT), a biosynthetic enzyme of GRb1 first discovered in 2005.

References 

Pharmacology
Biosynthesis